Coenagrion is a genus of damselflies in the family Coenagrionidae,
commonly called the Eurasian Bluets (although three species are found in North America: Coenagrion angulatum, Coenagrion interrogatum, and Coenagrion resolutum). Species of Coenagrion are generally medium-sized, brightly coloured damselflies.

Species 
The genus Coenagrion includes the following species:

Biology

Thermal adaptation

This genus's capacity for phenotypically plastic responses to the surface air temperature is important to species' ranges. These thermal responses will also decide a great deal of these species' responses to climate change. Nilsson-Örtman et al., 2012 find a high degree of thermal adaptation in high latitude populations of Coenagrion. They found similar plasticity even for various sympatric species at the same locations, and despite the highly variable weather at such latitudes.

References

Coenagrionidae
Zygoptera genera
Odonata of Asia
Odonata of Europe
Odonata of Australia
Odonata of North America
Taxa named by William Forsell Kirby
Insects described in 1890
Damselflies
Taxonomy articles created by Polbot